Hugo Nys and Tim Pütz were the defending champions but only Nys chose to defend his title, partnering Romain Arneodo. Nys successfully defended his title.

Arneodo and Nys won the title after defeating Jonathan Erlich and Fabrice Martin 7–5, 5–7, [10–8] in the final.

Seeds

Draw

References

External links
 Main draw

Play In Challenger - Doubles